The following railroads operate in the U.S. state of Iowa.

Common freight carriers
Boone and Scenic Valley Railroad (BSVY)
BNSF Railway (BNSF)
Burlington Junction Railway (BJRY)
Canadian National Railway (CN) through subsidiaries Illinois Central Railroad (IC) Cedar River Railroad (CEDR) and Chicago Central and Pacific Railroad (CC)
Canadian Pacific Railway (CP) through subsidiary Dakota, Minnesota and Eastern Railroad (DME)
Cedar Rapids and Iowa City Railway (CIC)
D&I Railroad (DAIR)
Iowa Interstate Railroad (IAIS)
Iowa Northern Railway (IANR)
Operates the D&W Railroad
Iowa Northwestern Railroad (IANW)
Iowa River Railroad (IARR)
Iowa Southern Railway (ISRY)
Iowa Traction Railroad (IATR)
Keokuk Junction Railway (KJRY)
Norfolk Southern Railway (NS)
Union Pacific Railroad (UP)

Private freight carriers
CBEC Railway
East Camden and Highland Railroad
Greater Davenport Redevelopment Corporation

Passenger carriers

Amtrak (AMTK)
Fourth Street Elevator

Defunct railroads

Electric
Albia Interurban Railway
Albia Light and Railway Company
Burlington Electric Railway
Burlington Railway and Light Company
Cedar Falls and Normal Railway
Cedar Rapids and Iowa City Railway and Light Company
Cedar Rapids and Marion City Railway
Centerville Light and Traction Company
Charles City Western Railway
Citizens' Railway and Light Company
Clinton, Davenport and Muscatine Railway
Clinton Street Railway
Clinton and Lyons Horse Railway
Colfax Springs Railway
Davenport and Muscatine Railway
Des Moines City Railway
Des Moines Street Railroad
Des Moines Suburban Railway
Dubuque Street Railway
Fort Dodge, Des Moines and Southern Railroad
Fort Dodge Street Railway
Fort Madison Street Railway
Inter-Urban Railway (ITU)
Iowa Railway and Light Company
Iowa City Electric Company
Iowa and Illinois Railway
Iowa Southern Utilities Company
Keokuk Electric Company
Keokuk Electric Railway and Power Company
Lake Manawa and Manhattan Beach Railway
Marshalltown Light, Power and Railway Company
Mason City and Clear Lake Railroad
Mississippi Valley Electric Company
Newton and Northwestern Railroad
Omaha and Council Bluffs Railway and Bridge Company
Omaha and Council Bluffs Street Railway
Omaha, Council Bluffs and Suburban Railway
Oskaloosa and Buxton Electric Railway
Oskaloosa Traction and Light Company
Ottumwa Railway and Light Company
Ottumwa Traction and Light Company
Sioux City, Crystal Lake and Homer Electric Railway
Sioux City, Homer and Southern Railway
Sioux City Service Company
Sioux City Traction Company
Tama and Toledo Railroad
Tama and Toledo Railway
Tri-City Railway
Tri-City Railway and Light Company
Union Electric Company
Waterloo, Cedar Falls and Northern Railroad
Waterloo, Cedar Falls and Northern Railway
Waterloo and Cedar Falls Rapid Transit Company
Waterloo Street Railway

Notes

References

Iowa DOT railroad map legend
Iowa Department of Transportation, Office of Rail Transportation (May 1999), Railroad Profiles.  Retrieved March 10, 2005.

 
 
Iowa railroads
Railroads